Ricky DeCarlo Smith (born July 20, 1960) is a former American football cornerback in the National Football League (NFL) for the New England Patriots, the Washington Redskins, and the Detroit Lions.  He played college football at Alabama State University and was drafted in the sixth round of the 1982 NFL Draft.

1960 births
Living people
People from Quincy, Florida
American football cornerbacks
Alabama State Hornets football players
New England Patriots players
Washington Redskins players
Detroit Lions players